"Empty Garden (Hey Hey Johnny)" is a song by English musician Elton John, written by John and Bernie Taupin, which first appeared on his sixteenth album Jump Up! released in 1982. It was the second single of the said album in the UK, and the lead single in the United States. The song is a tribute to John Lennon, who had been murdered 15 months earlier.

Composition and background
Lennon and John were good friends, and in 1974, Lennon appeared on John's single cover of "Lucy in the Sky with Diamonds", the B-side of which was Lennon's "One Day (At a Time)". The pair later collaborated on "Whatever Gets You thru the Night", which appeared on Lennon's album Walls and Bridges. Lennon agreed to appear in concert with John if "Whatever Gets You thru the Night" became a No. 1 single, which it did. On Thanksgiving Day, 1974, Lennon and John performed it, along with "Lucy in the Sky with Diamonds" and "I Saw Her Standing There" at Madison Square Garden. This would be Lennon's last live performance. The song title "Empty Garden" refers to the empty venue. The song uses a garden metaphor throughout to represent Lennon's efforts, achievements, and absence.

After Lennon's death, John was concerned that a tribute song to the late Beatle would be "clumsy" – until he saw Taupin's lyrics. The song is written using the chords of the E major scale.

Elton John wrote and recorded an earlier instrumental tribute to Lennon, "The Man Who Never Died", which was issued as the B-side of "Nikita" in 1985 and eventually included as a bonus track on the remastered reissue of Ice on Fire.

Music video
The music video featured John playing his piano and singing the track in front of a replica of Lennon's apartment, where he was assassinated.

Reception
Billboard said that it came closer to matching John's best work than any of his recent songs. Record World said that it's a "simple, touching tribute to John Lennon" and that "it features one of Elton's strongest vocal efforts in recent memory."

Elton has rarely performed the song live, after the 1982 world tour, because it brings back many painful memories of Lennon's murder, as he once stated during a concert on 5 November 1999, at the Kohl Center in Madison, Wisconsin, and prior to that at a concert on 9 October 1988 at The Centrum in Worcester, Massachusetts. In the latter case, John played the song, as well as "Lucy in the Sky with Diamonds", in his third encore to mark what would have been Lennon's 48th birthday.

Notable performances include one at Madison Square Garden, with Lennon's widow Yoko and Elton's godson Sean in the audience in 1982. He also performed the song during his first appearance on 17 April 1982 episode of Saturday Night Live hosted by Johnny Cash.

In April 2013, John added the song to the setlist of The Million Dollar Piano, his residency show at The Colosseum at Caesars Palace.

Personnel 
 Elton John – Yamaha CP-70 electric grand piano, harpsichord, vocals
 James Newton Howard – synthesizers
 Richie Zito – acoustic guitars
 Dee Murray – bass
 Jeff Porcaro – drums, LinnDrum
Three percussion instruments – namely castanets, maracas and tambourine – are audible, possibly overdubs from Jeff Porcaro or perhaps an uncredited percussionist.

Chart performance

Weekly charts

Year-end charts

References

External links
 Empty Garden's Lyrics at Letras.Mus.Br 

Elton John songs
1982 singles
Rock ballads
1980s ballads
Songs with music by Elton John
Songs with lyrics by Bernie Taupin
Songs about John Lennon
Song recordings produced by Chris Thomas (record producer)
Geffen Records singles
The Rocket Record Company singles
1982 songs